Drenov Bok is a village in central Croatia, in the municipality of Jasenovac, Sisak-Moslavina County.

History

Demographics
According to the 2011 census, the village of Drenov Bok has 82 inhabitants. This represents 36.94% of its pre-war population.

According to the 1991 census, 89.64% of the village population were ethnic Croats (199/222), 2.70% were ethnic Serbs (6/222),  and 7.66% were of other ethnic origin (17/222).

Sights 
 Monument and memorial to the victims of the Jasenovac concentration camp

Notable natives and residents

References

Populated places in Sisak-Moslavina County